Hennef (Sieg) is a town in the Rhein-Sieg district of North Rhine-Westphalia, Germany. Hennef is the fourth-biggest town in the Rhein-Sieg-Kreis (i.e. district). It is the site of the 15th-century castle, Schloss Allner, next to the Allner See. Within Hennef is the town of Stadt Blankenberg, with the castle of Blankenberg.

Hennef is also known as the "City of 100 villages".

Twin towns – sister cities

Hennef is twinned with:
 Banbury, England, United Kingdom (1981)
 Le Pecq, France (1997)
 Nowy Dwór Gdański, Poland (2001)

Trivia
 The first calibratable automatic weighing scales in the world were invented by Carl Reuther in Hennef
 Hennef's current district of Geistingen was first mentioned in a document from 885. Hennef itself was first mentioned in 1075 as "Hannafo"
 The national football team sometimes trains here; at the FIFA Confederations Cup in 2005 the Argentina national football team stayed here.
 Football teams Tura Hennef and F.C. Geistingen amalgamated in 2005 to become Hennef '05
 The song What Is Love by Haddaway was written and produced in Hennef

Notable people
Annika Zeyen (born 1985), Paralympic champion (wheelchair basketball and Handbike)
Joseph Dietzgen (1828–1888), philosopher
Hank Levine (born 1965), movie director, producer
Walter von Loë (1828–1908), Prussian field marshal
Ranga Yogeshwar (born 1959), scientist
Kim Petras (born 1992), pop singer and songwriter

References

External links

Stadt Hennef – Official website 
John Rosauer, "Erinnerungen an den Krieg an der Sieg." "Memories of War on the Sieg," an account of the destruction of Hennef by Allied forces during World War II, based on interviews with survivors.

Rhein-Sieg-Kreis